"Heart of Stone" is a song recorded by American singer Taylor Dayne for her second studio album Can't Fight Fate (1989). Produced by Ric Wake, the song was released on July 23, 1990, by Arista Records as the fourth and final single from Can't Fight Fate. The song is co-written by Elliot Wolff, responsible for Paula Abdul's number-one singles "Straight Up" and "Cold Hearted".

The single performed better on the US Adult Contemporary chart than it did on the Billboard Hot 100; it broke Dayne's streak of seven consecutive top-ten singles on the Billboard Hot 100, reaching number 12. The accompanying music video for "Heart of Stone" was included in Dayne's music video collection Twist of Fate.

Charts

Weekly charts

Year-end charts

References

1990 singles
Taylor Dayne songs
Songs written by Elliot Wolff
Song recordings produced by Ric Wake
Songs written by Gregg Tripp
1989 songs
Arista Records singles